Return of Sabata is a 1971 Spaghetti Western film directed by Gianfranco Parolini. The third film in The Sabata Trilogy, it features the return of Lee Van Cleef as the title character, which he had played in the first film, Sabata, but was replaced by Yul Brynner in the second film, Adiós, Sabata, due to a scheduling conflict. Return of Sabata was listed in the 1978 book The Fifty Worst Films of All Time.

Plot
Sabata, a former Confederate army officer and steely eyed, quick-drawing, impossibly accurate gunman with a trick gun, is working for a travelling circus as a stunt marksman. The circus comes to a small Texas town, where a former subordinate officer, a lieutenant from the army is running a crooked casino. The man owes Sabata $5,000 from sometime ago. Then the circus manager runs off with the circus funds, so Sabata decides to stay in town and try to collect on the debt from his friend. Sabata then runs into conflict with the town's land baron, McIntock, who imposes high taxes on gambling, drinking and prostitution with the supposed idea of building the town up, using the money. Sabata, who is after the money himself, finds out that the townspeople's money in McIntock's safe is counterfeit and that he and the priest have hidden it elsewhere, in the form of gold coins. After a few attempts on his life and many badmen dying under his guns, Sabata and the lieutenant are apparently killed so McIntock goes for the money, only to find them both still alive. Sabata is helped throughout by his friends: the acrobat, his partner and a fat, pompous man who is anything but what he seems.

Cast
 Lee Van Cleef as Sabata
 Reiner Schöne as Clyde
 Giampiero Albertini as Joe McIntock
 Ignazio Spalla as Bronco
 Annabella Incontrera as Maggie
 Jacqueline Alexandre as Jackie McIntock 
 Vassili Karis as Bionda the acrobat 
 Aldo Canti (as Nick Jordan) as Angel the acrobat
 Gianni Rizzo as Jeremy Sweeney
 Steffen Zacharias as Donovan
 Pia Giancaro as Diane
 John Bartha as Sheriff
 Günther Stoll as Circus Showman
 Carmelo Reale	as Chuck
 Franco Fantasia as Circus Owner

Release
Return of Sabata was released in Italy on 3 September 1971.

Reception
From a retrospective review, Donald Guarisco of AllMovie stated that the film "falls prey to the principle of diminishing returns" noting that it followed the plot of the original Sabata films too closely and that it had "erratic pacing" and was too long.

References

External links
 

Films directed by Gianfranco Parolini
Italian sequel films
West German films
French Western (genre) films
German Western (genre) films
Spaghetti Western films
United Artists films
1971 Western (genre) films
1971 films
Films produced by Alberto Grimaldi
Films scored by Marcello Giombini
Films set in Texas
Films shot in Croatia
1970s Italian films
1970s French films
1970s German films